Bruce Hayes (born June 9, 1955) is an American linguist and Distinguished Professor of Linguistics at the University of California, Los Angeles.

Life
He received his Ph.D. in 1980 from MIT, where his dissertation supervisor was Morris Halle.
Hayes works in phonology, and is well known for his book Metrical Stress Theory: Principles and Case Studies, a typologically based theory of stress systems.  His research interests also include phonetically based phonology and learnability.
In 2009 Hayes was inducted as a Fellow of the Linguistic Society of America.
He is married to phonetician Patricia Keating.

Books
(1985) A Metrical Theory of Stress Rules, Garland Press, New York.
(1995) Metrical Stress Theory:  Principles and Case Studies, University of Chicago Press, Chicago, 15 + 455 pp. .
(2004) Hayes, Bruce, Robert Kirchner, and Donca Steriade, eds., Phonetically Based Phonology.  Cambridge:  Cambridge University Press.   .
(2008) Introductory Phonology.  Malden, MA:  Blackwell.  .

References

External links
Homepage at UCLA

Living people
University of California, Los Angeles faculty
Linguists from the United States
American phonologists
1955 births
Fellows of the Linguistic Society of America
MIT School of Humanities, Arts, and Social Sciences alumni
Harvard University alumni
Distinguished professors in the United States
Ithaca High School (Ithaca, New York) alumni